Thompson Park is a 675-acre park and 925-acre nature reservation. The entire park is connected to sports fields operated by Monroe Township High School, and located in the municipalities of Monroe Township and Jamesburg in Middlesex County, New Jersey. It is the largest park in the Middlesex County Park System, and features Lake Manalapan at its center.

General Park Information
The park has a wide array of amenities, making it popular for families. It includes a playground, basketball courts, tennis courts, a disc golf course, a dog park, and open fields for other forms of recreation. On the shores of Lake Manalapan is an artificial beach, with volleyball nets. There are also various picnic grounds and gazebos.

Thompson Park Conservation Area

The nature reservation at Thompson Park totals about 925-acres and stretches from the main section of Thompson Park on Schoolhouse Road to the Gravel Hill. The heavily wooded reservation is located along the Manalapan Brook, with some of the land still being utilized by local farmers in cultivating crops. The reservation features roughly 9 miles of easy-to-moderate trails. There are two main trails, the main 8-mile Hoffman Station trail connects to the rest of Thompson Park through open fields and is considered easier. The shorter Gravel Hill trail traverses through hills and forestland, but is considered harder. Other activities such as walking, bird watching, and photography. Hunting is also allowed along the heavily forested Gravel Hill trail, but not on the more open Hoffman Station trail.

Thompson Park Zoo
The park also features a small fenced in zoo. The zoo has various native and exotic animals on display. Some of these animals include oats, pigs, emu, deer, turkeys, and peacocks.

Lake Manalapan
Located along the course of Manalapan Brook, Lake Manalapan is at the center of this park. Despite its name, the body of water is more akin to a pond rather than a traditional lake. Lake Manalapan is a popular place for fishermen and fisherwomen for freshwater fishing. The pond features a diverse species of fish, such as bass, bluegill, yellow perch, and black crappie. Other water activities such as kayaking and rowing are also popular, (although motorboats are not allowed on the lake).

References

Parks in Middlesex County, New Jersey
Jamesburg, New Jersey
Monroe Township, Middlesex County, New Jersey